Vashti is a Persian queen mentioned in the Book of Esther.

Vashti may also refer to:

People
Vashti Bartlett (1873–1969), American nurse who served with the American Red Cross during World War I, and in Siberia and Manchuria after the war
Vashti Bunyan (born 1945), English singer-songwriter
Vashti Clarke, NY based Jamaican model, actress, and entrepreneur
Vashti Cunningham (born 1998), American track and field athlete specializing in the high jump
Vashtie Kola (often stylized as Va$htie), American music video director, filmmaker, artist, designer, creative consultant and disc jockey
Vashti McCollum (1912–2006), the plaintiff in the landmark 1948 Supreme Court case McCollum v. Board of Education, which struck down religious education in public schools.
Vashti Murphy McKenzie (born 1947), a bishop of the African Methodist Episcopal Church.

Places
Vashti, Texas, an unincorporated community at the intersection of Farm to Market Road 174 and Farm to Market Road 1288, 18 miles southeast of Henrietta and four miles south of Bellevue in southeastern Clay County, Texas, United States

Others
Vashti (novel), by author Augusta Jane Evans published in 1869
William & Vashti College, a college in Aledo, Illinois from 1908 to 1918
Wasti